Momordicinin (13β,28-epoxy-urs-11-en-3-one) is chemical compound, a triterpene with formula , found in the fresh fruit of the bitter melon (Momordica charantia).

The compound is soluble in ethyl acetate and chloroform but not in petrol.  It crystallizes as irregular plates that melt at 146−147 °C.  It was isolated in 1997 by S. Begum and others.

See also 
 Momordicin I
 Momordicin-28
 Momordicilin
 Momordenol
 Momordol

References 

Triterpenes
Ketones